Kate Gaze (born 18 February 1990) is an Australian professional basketball player. She currently plays for the Townsville Fire in the WNBL.

Career

College
From 2009–2014, Gaze played for the Saint Mary's Gaels located in Moraga, California. Participating in the NCAA's Division I and primarily in the West Coast Conference.

St. Mary's statistics

Source

WNBL
After a successful college career in the United States, Gaze returned home to Australia and reignited her professional career with the Townsville Fire. She has since won two WNBL Championships, led by Suzy Batkovic and Cayla George. She has been re-signed for the 2017–18 season with the Capitals. From January through March 2018 she played professionally overseas for the BVUK. Sharks Wuerzburg in Germany's 2. division.

Personal life
Gaze, comes from an athletic background. Her father Mark represented Australia in basketball at the 1982 FIBA World Championship and played 182 National Basketball League games from 1983–1991. Her mother Michelle O'Connor was a WNBL champion with the Sydney Flames (now Sydney Uni Flames), and her grandfather Tony Gaze was a former Australian Opals coach. She is also related to Australian basketball legends Andrew Gaze (first cousin, once removed) and his father Lindsay Gaze (great-uncle).

References

1990 births
Living people
Australian expatriate basketball people in the United States
Australian women's basketball players
Townsville Fire players
Canberra Capitals players
Guards (basketball)
Saint Mary's Gaels women's basketball players
People educated at Endeavour Sports High School
People from Mulgrave, Victoria
Basketball players from Melbourne
Sportswomen from Victoria (Australia)